David Hurst Batteau (born June 25, 1949) is an American singer-songwriter. Batteau is the son of Blanca Batteau and Dr. Dwight Wayne Batteau, of Harvard University and Tufts University. He is the brother of singer-songwriter Robin Batteau.

History
Batteau is widely credited for writing songs for various entertainers, including Seals and Crofts, Trisha Yearwood, Michael Sembello and Shawn Colvin. He also co-wrote several songs with Madeleine Peyroux and Larry Klein for Peyroux's 2009 album, Bare Bones.

He has also focused on solo work, and has released one solo album, Happy in Hollywood (1976) on A&M Records.  Batteau had previously worked with his brother Robin as Batteaux, releasing one album on Columbia Records in 1971. This album contains the song "Tell Her She's Lovely" which was covered by El Chicano in 1973.

In the mid-1980s, Batteau formed the Pop/New Wave band Nomo, which released one album, The Great Unknown, in 1985, scoring a minor hit with "Red Lipstick" before disbanding. He also wrote and performed the song "Walk in Love," which was later covered by The Manhattan Transfer, reaching Number 12 on the UK Singles Chart.

Discography

Albums
1976: Happy in Hollywood
1993: Soul Mission

Singles
1976: "Walk in Love"

References

External links
 David Batteau at MySpace

1949 births
Living people
Musicians from Boston
Singer-songwriters from Massachusetts
American male singer-songwriters
American acoustic guitarists
American rock singers
American rock guitarists
A&M Records artists
Guitarists from Massachusetts
American male guitarists
20th-century American guitarists
20th-century American male musicians